Catherine "Cathy" Marshall is an American broadcast journalist who has worked as a reporter and anchorperson.  She has worked as an anchor for CNN and has also worked with news stations in Boston; New Haven, Connecticut; Seattle; and Portland, Oregon; and as a sideline reporter for Fox Sports Northwest. At the beginning of 2010, Marshall joined the news team of MDiTV, a medical news network also based in Portland, as an anchor.  Since December 2011, she has been working as a reporter and anchor at KGW-TV in Portland.

Marshall and husband John Marler co-anchored newscasts in some cities, including at Boston's WHDH and Portland's KATU.

Personal life
Marshall graduated with honors from Oregon State University in 1982 with a bachelor's degree in speech communications.

She is married to John Marler, also a news anchor, and the couple have four children.

References

Living people
Television anchors from Boston
CNN people
Television anchors from Portland, Oregon
Television anchors from Seattle
Oregon State University alumni
People from Eugene, Oregon
Year of birth missing (living people)
Lakeridge High School alumni